The Water Supplies Department (WSD) is the department under Development Bureau of the Government of Hong Kong of the People's Republic of China providing a reliable and adequate supply of wholesome potable water and sea water to customers in Hong Kong. The headquarter office is located at the Immigration Tower on Gloucester Road.

Organisational structure
 Customer service branch
 Development branch
 Finance and information technology branch
 Mechanical and electrical branch
 New works branch
 Operations branch
 Contract advisory unit
 Public relations unit
 Departmental administration division
 General administration section

Transportation
The WSD headquarter office is accessible within walking distance North of Wan Chai station of the MTR.

See also
 Water supply and sanitation in Hong Kong
 Engineer's Office of the Former Pumping Station
 Argyle Street Waterworks Depot

References

External links
 

1982 establishments in Hong Kong
Government agencies established in 1982
Hong Kong government departments and agencies
Water supply and sanitation in Hong Kong